is a former Japanese football player.

Playing career
Saito was born in Tokyo on November 13, 1970. He joined Yomiuri from youth team in 1989. In 1992, he moved to Brazilian club XV Novembro-Jaú. In 1993, he returned to Japan and joined Shimizu S-Pulse. Although he played many matches as defender in 1993, he could hardly play in the match in 1994. In 1995, he moved to Japan Football League club Brummell Sendai. He retired end of 1995 season.

Club statistics

References

External links

geocities.co.jp

1970 births
Living people
Association football people from Tokyo
Japanese footballers
Japan Soccer League players
J1 League players
Japan Football League (1992–1998) players
Tokyo Verdy players
Shimizu S-Pulse players
Vegalta Sendai players
Association football defenders